Martle N. Mukhim is the chief of the Meghalaya Democratic Party, a political party in the Indian state of Meghalaya. He has formerly represented Dienglieng constituency and is a four-time member of Meghalaya Assembly from 1988-2008.

References

Meghalaya politicians
Living people
Year of birth missing (living people)
Meghalaya MLAs 1988–1993
Meghalaya MLAs 1998–2003
Meghalaya MLAs 1993–1998
Meghalaya MLAs 2003–2008